Sant Andreu de Llavaneres is a municipality located 36 km north of Barcelona (Catalonia) (Spain), along the Mediterranean coast, between Mataró and Sant Vicenç de Montalt. It belongs to the Maresme comarca and the Barcelona province. The short name is simply Llavaneres.

Llavaneres faces the sea to the east and a natural park to the west. The village has a mixed agricultural and residential character and has become a popular vacation and summer-residence location for people living in Barcelona over the last forty years.

Good connections with Barcelona, the Maresme coast and the Mediterranean axis of France and Spain include a train line to Barcelona, as well as the C-32 highway and the N-2 road.

Sant Andreu de Llavaneres is today well known for its upscale sailing in summer.

History 
The oldest archaeological remains are from the Neolithic, especially the rocks of "Sant Magí" in the mountains of Montalt. Between the rivers Llavaneres and les Bruixes, the village Can Sanç dates from Roman times, where vineyards and olive trees were cultivated. The economic activity, as in Mataro and other communities, was purely agricultural. Later called Sant Andreu de Llavaneres, it was part of Mataro and gained independence in the mid-sixteenth century. Sant Andreu de Llavaneres became the resort of the better society of Barcelona (1920). Several of his modernist buildings, built by architects like Joaquim Lloret i Homs, date from this period.

Demography

References

 Panareda Clopés, Josep Maria; Rios Calvet, Jaume; Rabella Vives, Josep Maria (1989). Guia de Catalunya, Barcelona: Caixa de Catalunya.  (Spanish).  (Catalan).

External links
Official website 
 Government data pages 
Historic-artistic heritage

Municipalities in Maresme